Yohann Kouam (born 1982), is a French filmmaker as well as a producer, screenwriter of Cameroonian descent. He has made several critically acclaimed short films.

Personal life
Yohann is a French film director. His father is an accountant and mother is a hotelier.

Career
He studied film editing at Institut des arts de diffusion (IAD) in Brussels, and then Translation Studies in France. He later became a teaching assistant in high school to give language lessons.

In 2007, Kouam made a short film Fragments de vie. With its critical reception, he made the second short film Les dimanches de Léa in 2010. He then made the short film The Return in 2013, which became internationally acclaimed. In 2016, he made the film From San Francisco with Love.

Filmography

References

External links
 
 Quartiers Lointains

French film directors
Living people
Mass media people from Lille
French filmmakers
1982 births
French people of Cameroonian descent
French screenwriters